Tepeköy is a village in the Dursunbey district of Balıkesir province in Turkey.

References

Villages in Dursunbey District